Lundie is a surname. Notable people with the surname include:

Bill Lundie (1888–1917), South African cricketer
Frank Lundie (1866–1933), Australian trade unionist
James Lundie (footballer) (1857–1942), Scottish footballer
Robert Lundie (died 1500), Lord High Treasurer of Scotland